Orientus ishidae, common name Japanese leafhopper or Mosaic leafhopper, is a species of leafhoppers belonging to the family Cicadellidae subfamily Deltocephalinae.

Description

The adults reach  of length. This leafhopper shows a distinctive mosaic-like pattern on the forewings and an orange band between the eyes. Orientus ishidae is associated with willow (Salix species), hornbeam (Carpinus betulus) and with many woody plants and deciduous trees. It may cause serious leaf damages to several tree species and is implicated as a vector of the phytoplasmic flavescence dorée (FD) disease in vineyards. Adults can be found from June to October.

The nymphs are strongly coloured, the patterning is variable. They often adopt a tail-up posture in response to danger, as seen on the left.

Distribution
This species is endemic to the East Palearctic realm and it is present in the Nearctic realm and the Oriental realm. It has been introduced in United Kingdom (first reported in Peckham, 2011), Germany, Italy, Switzerland and in several other European countries.

References

General
 Biolib
 Catalogue of Life
 Fauna Europaea
 British Bugs
 American Insects

Insects of Japan
Insects described in 1902
Athysanini